Qareh Makher (also Romanized as Qareh Mākher; also known as Qarah Mākhvor, Ghareh Māklher, and Qareh Mākhūr) is a village in Atrak Rural District, Dashli Borun District, Gonbad-e Qabus County, Golestan Province, Iran. At the 2006 census, its population was 1,100, in 236 families.

References 

Populated places in Gonbad-e Kavus County